George Ross (15 April 1943 – 7 May 2016) was a Scottish footballer who played as a full-back in the Football League during the 1960s and 1970s, most notably with Preston North End. Surprisingly, Ross never started his senior professional football career with any of the three Highland Football League Clubs in Inverness at that time, and went south to Preston as a schoolboy.

He started with Preston as a junior and after making his debut for them in the early 1960s, he went on to play 386 league games for them. This included a place in the 1964 FA Cup Final team.

In the early 1970s, he left to join Southport and played 31 league games for them in Football League Division Four.

In April 2009, he was honoured with a Lifetime Achievement award by Preston, and he worked for them in the commercial department on matchdays.

Ross died on 7 May 2016, aged 73.

References 

1943 births
2016 deaths
Scottish footballers
English Football League players
North American Soccer League (1968–1984) players
Preston North End F.C. players
Southport F.C. players
Washington Diplomats (NASL) players
Morecambe F.C. players
Association football fullbacks
Footballers from Inverness
Scottish football managers
Southport F.C. managers
Scottish expatriate sportspeople in the United States
Expatriate soccer players in the United States
Scottish expatriate footballers
FA Cup Final players